Meso-Papilionoideae is a monophyletic clade of the flowering plant subfamily Faboideae (or Papilionoideae) that includes the majority of papilionoid legumes. This clade is consistently resolved in molecular phylogenies. It contains many agronomically important genera, including Arachis (peanut), Cicer (chickpea), Glycine (soybean), Medicago (alfalfa), Phaseolus (common bean), Trifolium (clover), Vicia (vetch), and Vigna (mung bean).

Description
This clade circumscribes six subordinate clades: one traditional tribe (Exostyleae) and five informal clades (the genistoids, the vataireoids, the dalbergioids, the Andira clade, and the Old World Clade), as well as the genus Amphimas. The clade has the following ICPN-compliant, node-based definition:

The most inclusive crown clade exhibiting the structural rearrangement in the plastid genome (inversion of a ~50 Kb segment in the large-single copy region with endpoints between the accD and trnK regions) homologous with that found in Aldina latifolia Spruce ex Benth. 1870, Holocalyx balansae Micheli 1883, Maackia amurensis Rupr. 1856, Wisteria floribunda (Willd.) DC. 1825, and Glycine max (L.) Merr. 1917, where these taxa are extant species included in the crown clade defined by this name.

References

Meso-Papilionoideae
Plant unranked clades